Mainland Australia is the main landmass of the Australian continent, excluding the Aru Islands, New Guinea, Tasmania, and other Australian offshore islands. The landmass also constitutes the mainland of the territory governed by the Commonwealth of Australia, and the term, along with continental Australia, can be used in a geographic sense to exclude surrounding continental islands and external territories. Generally, the term is applied to the states of New South Wales, Queensland, South Australia, Victoria, and Western Australia, as well as the Australian Capital Territory, Jervis Bay Territory, and Northern Territory.

The term is typically used when referring to the relationship between Tasmania and the other Australian states, in that people not from Tasmania are referred to as mainlanders. Tasmania has been omitted on a number of occasions from maps of Australia, reinforcing the divide between Tasmania and the mainland. The 1982 Commonwealth Games in Brisbane left Tasmania off the map of Australia during the opening ceremony, as did the designs of the Australian Swim Team uniform for the 2014 Commonwealth Games in Glasgow.

It is sometimes described as an island. Its population is about 25.152 million, 98% of Australia's total population.
Mainland Australia has a variety of climatic regions, ranging from tropical rainforests and deserts to cool temperature rainforests to snow-covered mountains. It is in these mainland regions that much of Australia's native flora and fauna can be found.

History 

Early in the Cretaceous Period, 130 million years ago, Australia (and Antarctica) separated from a supercontinent known as Gondwana. Antarctica's separation from Australia began roughly 85 million years ago, at a rate of a few millimetres per year.
It took over 30 million years (53 million years ago), toward the end of the Palaeocene epoch, for Australia to fully separate from Antarctica and set course for where we see the two continents today.

Over the next 6,000  years the ice gradually melted, increasing sea-levels, cutting off Papua New Guinea and Tasmania from mainland Australia.

Prehistory

It has been estimated that Australian Aborigines occupied mainland Australia up to 50,000 to 60,000  years ago, well before the last ice-age. Although an exact figure has not been decided on, numerous DNA studies all confirm that Aboriginal Australians are one of the oldest living populations in the world outside of Africa. 
Prior to the arrival of Europeans on the Australian mainland in the late 18th century, over 500 different clan groups (nations) each with unique cultures, beliefs and languages inhabited territories on the mainland. Currently, Indigenous people living on the mainland make up 2.4% of the total Australian population, encompassing over 250 language groups.

European colonization
The first documented encounter of the Australian mainland was by Willem Janszoon in 1606, as he sailed around Australia's north coast arriving in present-day Cape York, Queensland. These explorations led way to the term ‘Terra Australis', Latin for South Land, which was hypothesised on the notion there must be land in the Southern Hemisphere to balance the land mass in the Northern Hemisphere. This encounter led several other Dutch, Spanish, Portuguese and British journeyings to Terra Australis throughout the 17th and 18th century, progressively mapping what we now know to be as (mainland) Australia. 
The most famous and well documented expedition of Australia occurred 164 years after Janszoon's journey, through British navigator and explorer James Cook. He documented the first interaction of the Eastern Australian coastline, and on 23 April 1770, Cook made the first recorded observation of Indigenous Australians at nowadays Brush Island. This journey, coupled with numerous other reports, ultimately led the British to establish a penal colony in Australia, firstly at Botany Bay.

Geography

 
The Australian mainland's geology and climate is one of its defining features. Despite being surrounded by ocean, approximately 20% of the Australian Mainland is classified as desert. This is due to the extremely variable rain patterns across the mainland. Toward the barren centre of the Mainland, the rainfall pattern is concentric and sparse, whereas there is higher intensity rainfall toward the Mainland's tropics and coastal areas.
Australia lies on the middle of the Indo-Australian tectonic plate and as a result is not influenced by any severe tectonic activity. Over millions of years, the shifting of these tectonic plates has seen the Australian mainland undergo many physical changes. Mountain ranges and seas have come and gone, and the forces of weathering and erosion have formed much of the mainlands current topography. 
These physical changes developed four primary landform divisions spread throughout the mainland states and territories; the Coastal Plains, the Eastern and Southern highlands, the Central Lowlands (and Deserts) and the Western and Northern Plateaus (and Basins).

Coastal Plains 

Along the Eastern seaboard of the mainland are the Coastal Plains; a narrow strip of land along the East coast of Australia from Queensland to Victoria. This division is host to some of the mainlands major cities, namely, Brisbane, Sydney and Melbourne, due to its hospitable conditions. Some sources refer to the Coastal Plains as the entire coastline of the mainland, outspreading beyond the East Coast.

Eastern Highlands 
Incorporating several mountain ranges which extend  the Highlands run parallel to the East coast of the mainland; covering Queensland, New South Wales, the Australian Capital Territory and Victoria. The highlands were formed around 80 million years ago, and are some of the oldest and most prominent in the world. This area is very rugged and primarily consists of a series of tablelands and plateaus. The highlands are much more prominent toward the South East of the mainland and form the Southern Highlands, which are located across (south) New South Wales, the Australian Capital Territory and Victoria. These Southern highlands (see Snowy Mountains) experience snowfall for more than half the year during the Winter seasons due to their higher altitude.

Central Lowlands 
It is home to the Sturt and Simpson deserts and closer to Central Australia lie some desert mountain ranges (MacDonnell and Musgrave). The Central Lowlands incorporates three primary drainage basins: in the North, the Carpentaria Lowlands, Lake Eyre toward the centre and the Murray-Darling Basin down South. The lowest point on the mainland is found in this division at Lake Eyre, at 50m below sea level.

Western Plateau 

Approximately 144 to 65 million years ago (Cretaceous period), there lay a great inland sea, stretching over one quarter of the mainland. The evaporation of this ocean left behind what we now know as the Western Plateau. The Western and Northern Plateaus incorporate nearly all Western Australia and the Northern Territory and parts of South Australia. 
Over one-third of the mainland, the Plateaus are made of one stable block of igneous and metamorphic rock which is up to 3.6 billion years old. Despite this, the Plateau is a huge area of tablelands, averaging 500m above sea level in some parts. It is home to Uluru, Kata Tjuta, the Finke River, the Victorian Desert, the Great Sandy Desert and the Gibson Desert.
Much of the Western Plateau receives minimal rainfall and thus appears red in colour. Conversely, the Northern Plateau experiences heavy rainfall throughout the wet season (November to April), due to its more tropical location compared to the Western Plateau.

Natural resources
Australia's separation from the other continents resulted in a long period of uplift, erosion and thick terrigenous deposition in rift valleys.  It was these processes which over millions of years has led to the accumulation of Australia's main known mineral, oil and gas resources. Most of Australia's oil and gas exploration occurs off the mainland. However, on the mainland, the abundance of minerals (and thus metals) has formed the basis of Australia's dependence on mining; exporting much of these natural occurring resources overseas.

Mining

The Australian Mainland is host to some of the world's largest open-cut and underground mines. Across the mainland states (besides the ACT), there are over 350 operating mines (website), producing 19 useful rocks and minerals. These mines allow Australia to be one of the world's largest producers of: iron ore, coal, bauxite (aluminium ore), manganese, nickel, copper, gold, silver, cobalt, lead, copper, uranium, opal and diamond. Some of the largest mines on the Australian mainland are listed below:

Renewables

The Australian mainland's various geology and climate, has led to the increased utilisation of renewable energy (solar, wind and hydro) over recent decades. In 2021, approximately 28.9% of the mainland's total electricity generation was from renewable energy sources with South Australia at 66.5% renewable energy generation, Victoria at 33.4%, Western Australia at 31.5%, New South Wales at 26.0% and Queensland at 19.6%. The majority of this renewable energy was generated through wind and solar, proportionally contributing 35.9% and 38.3% respectively.

Politics

Australian political decisions are typically deliberated and enacted within the limits of homeland (mainland Australia) soil. Despite Tasmania being one of Australia's six British establishment colonies, Tasmania has often been looked over due to the state's small size and general isolation. This is observed through the states and territories of mainland Australia representing 146 of the 151 members in Parliament.

State formation
From 1788 to 1859, Britain established five colonies on the Australian mainland, and one in Tasmania. All six colonies were constitutionally connected to Britain, each with their own parliament and courts, with their respective laws subject to the laws of British Parliament.

These colonies formed the six states of Australia; New South Wales, Victoria, Western Australia, South Australia (included the Northern Territory at this time), Queensland and Tasmania. In 1901, the six states were united as the Commonwealth of Australia, under a new federal constitution. In 1911, the Northern Territory was transferred from South Australia to the Commonwealth and formed a territory.

Capital selection

After Federation in 1901, it was always assumed the Australian capital would lay on the mainland. However, the location of the capital sparked years of negotiating between politicians in New South Wales and Victoria, the two most prominent states, who each wanted their capital, Sydney and Melbourne respectively, to become the new country's capital.

After years of debate to no avail, the two states decided on a compromise that met the requirements of the Australian Constitution. A separate territory (the Australian Capital Territory) was to be established on land given by New South Wales, however it must be at least  from Sydney. This territory would contain the official capital of Australia, and until then, Parliament would sit in Melbourne until the city (now Canberra) was built. In 1909, this compromise was agreed upon and was finally legislated in 1911.

On 12 March 1913, Canberra or Ngunnawal country to the Indigenous people of the area, was officially named as the capital of Australia. In 1915, Jervis Bay territory was added to the Australian Capital Territory to ensure the Commonwealth had a seaport.

See also 
 Fauna of Australia
 Flora of Australia
 Natural history of Australia
 Geography of Australia
 List of islands of Australia
 States and territories of Australia
 European exploration of Australia

Notes

References 

Australian culture
Geography of Australia
Australia